This is a list of law firms that were established prior to the independence of Malaya.

States

Penang 

 Adams and Alan, Penang (1900s)
 Ong Huck Lim (later known as Huck Lim & Hock Soo), 16A, Ah Quee building,  Beach Street, Penang, SS (1930s)
 Hogan and Ivens, Penang and Malacca (founded by Claude Douglas Devereux Hogan and F. Burdett Ivens) (1930s)
 T. Rowan, Penang (1940)
 Cheng Ean and Soon Chee (founded by Lim Cheng Ean and Khoo Soon Chee), (1930s)
 Hogan, Adams and Allen (formerly known as Adams and Allen (1900s)), Penang (1930s)
 Logan & Ross, Penang (established 1874)
 Chew Choon Poon, 5, Church Street, Penang (1940s)
 GE Wright-Motion, Penang (1900s)
 H. H Abdoolcader, Georgetown Chambers, 39 Beach Street, Penang (1910s)
 Raghavan & Coy, Penang (1940s)
 Samuel Fung, Penang and Batu Pahat (1910s to 1930s)
 S. R Groom, 2, Church Street, Penang (circa 1890s)
 Presgrave and Clutton (founded by Edward William Presgrave and Walter Clutton in 1894 and dissolved in 1898)
 Presgrave & Matthews, Penang (established by Edward William Presgrave and W. Bromhead Matthews in 1898)
 William McNight Young, Penang (1910)

Kuala Lumpur 

 Freeman & Madge, 54, Klyne Street, Kuala Lumpur (founded by ) (circa 1908)
 Shook Lin & Bok (also known as Shook Lin & Ramani in 1930), Kuala Lumpur (established 1918)
 Peter Chong & Co, Kuala Lumpur (circa 1930s)
 Lovelace & Hastings (founded by W. G. Warren Hastings), Kuala Lumpur (established 1913)
 Bannon & Bailey, Laidlaw Buildings, Java Street, Kuala Lumpur (founded by  R. B. Bannon and Arnold Savage Bailey in 1920s and dissolved in 1963)
 Shearn, Delamore & Co (merger between Pooley & Co (established 1905) and Ford & Delamore (established 1922)), Kuala Lumpur (established 1938)
 Sanders and Co, Kuala Lumpur (1920s)
 Hewgill & Day (circa 1900s)
 Joaquim Brothers (circa 1890s)

Malacca 

 Allen & Gledhill, Malacca (1930s)
 Goh Tiow Wan, 20, Jonker Street, (Top floor), Malacca (1930s)
 Rogers and Son, No. 40, First Cross Street, Malacca (1910s)
 Sault & Co, Malacca (also once known as Sault, Keith Sellar & Co, 64, First Cross Street, Malacca) (1930s)
 S. G Pillay, No. 15, First Cross Street, Malacca (circa 1920s)
 Mark Stone, 7, Heeren Street, Malacca (circa 1910s)
 Zehnder Bros, No. 27, Church Street, Malacca (circa 1910s)

Perak 

 Byrant & Taylor (founded by Francis John Byrant in 1896), Ipoh
 Das & Co, Ipoh (1930s)
 Cheang Lee & Ong, 13 Hale Street, Ipoh (1940s)
 Gibb & Co (formerly known as Gibb & Hope), Ipoh, Kuala Lumpur and Penang (established 1892)
 Maxwell Kenion Cowdy & Jones (merger between Maxwell & Kenion (established 1905), and Cowdy & Jones (established 1913)), Ipoh
 Wreford and Thornton, Ipoh (circa 1910)
 J Dunford-Wood, Ipoh (circa 1920)
 Presgrave, Matthews and Maxwell, Ipoh (1900s)

Johor 

 M. Ismail, 38, Jalan Ibrahim, Johor Bahru (1930s)
 S.C Goho, No. 8, Jalan Petrie, Muar (1920s)

Negeri Sembilan 

 Ernest Jeff, 5, Cameron Street, Seremban (1930s)

See also 
Certificate in Legal Practice (Malaysia)
Malaysian Bar
Kuala Lumpur Bar

References

External links 
 
 

Law of Malaysia